Christian Gaudin (born 26 January 1967) is a former French international handball player and current handball coach. He has served as the manager of the Romanian men's national team in 2014.

Gaudin is currently working as the head coach of Cesson Rennes MHB since his appointment in the summer of 2018.

Player achievements
LNH Division 1:
Winner: 1988, 1990, 1991, 1993
Pro D2:
Winner: 2004
Coupe de France:
Winner: 1994
Bundesliga:
Winner: 2001
EHF Champions League:
Winner: 2002
EHF Champions Trophy:
Winner: 2001, 2002
EHF Cup:
Winner: 2001
World Championship: 
Gold Medalist: 1995, 2001
Silver Medalist: 1993
Bronze Medalist: 1997

Coaching achievements 
LNH Division 1 
Bronze Medalist: 2012
Pro D2 
Winner: 2007
Coupe de France:
Semifinalist: 2003
Coupe de la Ligue   
Finalist: 2010, 2012, 2014

References

1967 births
Living people
Sportspeople from Côte-d'Or
French male handball players
French handball coaches
French expatriate sportspeople in Germany
French expatriate sportspeople in Romania
Expatriate handball players
Olympic handball players of France
Handball players at the 1996 Summer Olympics
Handball players at the 2000 Summer Olympics